The Seattle International Comedy Competition is a month-long stand-up comedy competition held at various venues throughout Washington State. It has been held every year since 1980 until 2020, when the competition was not run due to pandemic restrictions.

Format 
Contestants are scored by a panel of judges, not by audience vote. 32 contestants are divided into two week-long heats. The 5 top-rated performers from each heat meet for a week of semi-final performances, and the top five of those compete in the finals week.

Competitors 

Many well-known comedians and actors have competed, including 1997 winner Mitch Hedberg, Aisha Tyler, Christopher Titus, Ron Funches, Arj Barker, Sean Kent, radio host Bill Radke, Dwight Slade, Dax Jordan, Auggie Smith, Tom Cotter, Joe Klocek, Jeff Dye, Josh Gondelman, Anne Edmonds, Ria Lina, and Rory Scovel.

The winner of the 2016 Seattle International Comedy Competition was Preacher Lawson.

The winner of the 2019 Seattle International Comedy Competition was Nancy Norton, who became only the second woman to ever win the Seattle International Comedy Competition, following the late Peggy Platt, who won in 1985.  The 2021 Champion, Danny Martinello, becomes only the second Canadian citizen to win the competition, following Damonde Tschritter in 2006.  

The current champion, Ari Matti from Estonia, becomes the first performer hailing from outside of North America to ever win the Seattle International Comedy Competition.

Previous winners

References

External links
 Official Festival Site 
 

Festivals in Washington (state)
Comedy festivals in the United States